The Wire Building is an historic structure located at 1000 Vermont Ave NW at the intersection of Vermont and K Streets, in Downtown Washington, D.C.  It was listed on the District of Columbia Inventory of Historic Sites in 2012 and on the National Register of Historic Places in 2013. The building was designed by architect Alvin L. Aubinoe from the architectural firm of Aubinoe and Edwards and built between 1949 and 1950.

References

Office buildings completed in 1950
Office buildings on the National Register of Historic Places in Washington, D.C.
Office buildings in Washington, D.C.
Modernist architecture in Washington, D.C.